George Gordon, 2nd Marquess of Aberdeen and Temair  (20 January 1879 – 6 January 1965), styled Lord Haddo until 1916 and Earl of Haddo from 1916 to 1934, was a Scottish peer and politician.

Aberdeen was born in 1879 at Grosvenor Square, London, the eldest son of The 7th Earl of Aberdeen (later created The 1st Marquess of Aberdeen and Temair in 1916) and his wife, Ishbel, daughter of The 1st Baron Tweedmouth. He was educated at Harrow, St Andrews University, and Balliol College, Oxford. He was a Progressive member of the London County Council for Peckham from 1910 to 1925 and for Fulham West from 1931 to 1934. He was also Chairman of the Charity Organization Society from 1934 to 1937 and Lord-Lieutenant of Aberdeenshire between 1934 and 1965. Aberdeen was invested as an Officer of the Order of the British Empire (OBE) in 1920, as a Knight of the Order of St John (KStJ) in 1949, and was awarded an honorary doctorate of Laws from the University of Aberdeen in 1954.

Lord Aberdeen and Temair married, firstly, Mary Florence Clixby, on 6 August 1906. After her death in 1937 he married, secondly, Anna Orrok Stronach Sheila Forbes, on 21 December 1940. She died in 1949. There were no children from the two marriages. Lord Aberdeen and Temair died in January 1965, aged 85, and was succeeded in the marquessate by his younger brother, Dudley.

Notes

References
Kidd, Charles, Williamson, David (editors). Debrett's Peerage and Baronetage (1990 edition). New York: St Martin's Press, 1990,

External links

 
 

1879 births
1965 deaths
People from Mayfair
2
Deputy Lieutenants of Aberdeenshire
Knights of the Order of St John
Lord-Lieutenants of Aberdeenshire
Officers of the Order of the British Empire
People educated at Harrow School
Alumni of the University of St Andrews
Alumni of Balliol College, Oxford
Members of London County Council
Progressive Party (London) politicians